"The Devil in the Dark" is the twenty-fifth episode of the first season of the American science fiction television series Star Trek. Written by Gene L. Coon and directed by Joseph Pevney, the episode first aired on March 9, 1967.

In this episode, the Enterprise is called to investigate deaths at a planetary mining facility. Spock and Kirk go on an away mission to the facility, leading to them facing off against a deadly subterranean creature.

This episode marks the first appearance of Doctor McCoy's catchphrase, "I'm a doctor, not a ..."

Plot
The USS Enterprise arrives at the pergium mining colony on planet Janus VI to help the colony deal with an unknown creature that has killed 50 miners and engineers, and destroyed equipment with a strong corrosive substance. Captain Kirk, Spock, and McCoy meet with the mine supervisor, Chief Engineer Vanderberg. During the briefing, Spock's attention is drawn to a silicon nodule on Vanderberg's desk, which Vanderberg dismisses as a geological oddity. They are alerted to a problem in the colony's nuclear reactor, and find its guard killed and the main circulating pump stolen. The part has long since gone out of production, so no replacements are available. Chief Engineer Scott jury rigs a substitute, but it fails shortly thereafter, necessitating the missing part be found and reinstalled before the reactor goes super-critical in 10 hours.

Kirk and his security team search for the creature. Spock, suspecting it may be a silicon based lifeform, modifies their phasers to be more effective against silicon. They encounter the creature—which has the appearance of molten rock—and fire upon it, breaking a piece of it off. The creature flees by burrowing through a rock wall. Spock analyzes the fragment, whose composition resembles fibrous asbestos. He deduces that it burrows through solid rock by secreting the same corrosive substance that has killed the miners. Spock adjusts his tricorder to scan for silicon-based life, and confirms that the creature is the only such lifeform for miles.

Kirk and Spock happen upon a chamber containing thousands of the silicon nodules. The creature causes a cave-in that separates Kirk from Spock. Though Spock urges Kirk to kill it, Kirk observes the creature backs off whenever he aims his phaser at it. Spock finds a way around the cave-in and joins Kirk. He attempts a mind meld with the creature, but perceives little but intense pain. The creature etches the ambiguous message "NO KILL I" into a rock, having gained some knowledge of human language from the meld. By making physical contact with the creature, Spock establishes a deeper mind meld. He learns that the creature is called a Horta, and that its species dies out completely every 50,000 years, save for one individual that remains alive to protect the eggs, which are the silicon nodules. As the nodule eggs hatch, the single adult Horta acts as a protective mother to this next generation. Though nearing death because of her wound, the Horta communicates through Spock, telling them the location of the stolen pump. There Kirk also discovers thousands of broken eggs which were destroyed by the miners as worthless.

The miners arrive and attempt to attack the creature. Kirk and Spock stop them, explaining that it was only protecting its eggs when it killed humans. Dr. McCoy successfully treats the Horta's wound using a silicon-based cement normally used for building emergency shelters. The miners fear the prospect of thousands of Horta, but Kirk convinces them that the Horta are peaceful and could collaborate with the miners by tunneling for them.

Kirk, Spock, and McCoy return to the Enterprise, prepare to leave orbit, and learn from Vanderberg that the eggs have hatched and already the new Horta have uncovered rich veins of pergium and other valuable metals.

Production
The Horta was played by stuntman and acrobat Janos Prohaska, who also designed the costume. Prohaska was promised that if he created something good enough, the producers would rent the costume and pay Prohaska to play the part. Episode writer Gene Coon was convinced of the costume's effectiveness after an impromptu demonstration by Prohaska in the studios.

William Shatner says this is his favorite episode of the series. His father died during its filming, but Shatner insisted on going through with production, and felt closer to the cast and crew for helping him through the difficult time.

This episode also marks the first appearance of Doctor McCoy's catchphrase, "I'm a doctor, not a ...!" In this case, the line is, "I'm a doctor, not a bricklayer!", said by McCoy when Kirk orders him to heal the Horta.

Link to Kolchak: The Night Stalker
The series finale of the Universal Television series Kolchak: The Night Stalker, entitled "The Sentry" (1975), takes its plot directly from this episode.

Reception

Cast 
William Shatner wrote in his memoirs that "The Devil in the Dark" was his favorite original Star Trek episode. He thought it was "exciting, thought-provoking and intelligent, it contained all of the ingredients that made up our very best Star Treks". In the documentary 50 Years of Star Trek, Leonard Nimoy also named "The Devil in the Dark" as an "interesting episode", stating "I thought [it] was a wonderful episode about the fear of the unknown, how we fear and even hate something that we don't know anything about, learn who your enemy is, and it's not, maybe then it's no longer your enemy."

Critical 
In 2009, Zack Handlen of The A.V. Club gave the episode an 'A' rating, describing it as a classic and noting the well-written roles of Kirk, Spock and McCoy. In 2012, The A.V. Club ranked this episode as one of the top ten "must see" episodes of the original series. In 2017, Business Insider ranked "The Devil in the Dark" the 4th best episode of the original series.

In 2012, Christian Science Monitor ranked this the eighth best episode of the original Star Trek.

In 2013, W.I.R.E.D. magazine ranked this episode one of the top ten most underrated episodes of the original television series.

In 2015, New York Public Library rated this episode as having Spock's fourth best scene in the show.

In 2015, Tor.com called it "one of the greatest episodes" of Star Trek.

In 2016, Vox rated this one of the top 25 essential episodes of all Star Trek.

In 2016, Empire ranked "Devil in the Dark" 2nd in the top 50 episodes of all Star Trek.

In 2017, Business Insider ranked "Devil in the Dark" the 4th best episode of the original series.

In 2018, Collider ranked this episode the 10th best original series episode.

In 2018, PopMatters ranked this the number one best episode of the original series.

See also 
 "Home Soil", the eighteenth episode of Star Trek: The Next Generation, where a naturally occurring crystalline lifeform is encountered
 HORTA—a backronym used in the mining industry, based on the Horta in this Star Trek episode

References

External links

 

 "The Devil in the Dark" Review of the remastered version at TrekMovie.com
 "The Devil in the Dark" Final draft with revisions dated January 6–18, 1967; report & analysis by Dave Eversole
 "The Devil in the Dark" Screenshots before and after remastering
 "The Devil in the Dark" —Full episode for viewing at Paramount+

1967 American television episodes
Star Trek: The Original Series (season 1) episodes
Television episodes directed by Joseph Pevney
Television episodes written by Gene L. Coon

it:Specie di Star Trek (serie classica)#Horta